Coleman Regis "Coley" McDonough (October 10, 1915July 5, 1965) was a professional American football quarterback in the National Football League. He played four seasons for the Pittsburgh Steelers and the Chicago Cardinals.

A native of North Braddock, Allegheny County, Pennsylvania, he graduated from  St. Thomas High School there. In 1944 McDonough also played for "Card-Pitt", a team that was the result of a temporary merger between the Cardinals and the Steelers. The teams' merger was result of the manning shortages experienced league-wide due to World War II. Six days before the team's second game of the season, McDonough was drafted into the United States Army.

Police career and death
Coley later became a Pittsburgh, Pennsylvania police officer, and served 15 years with that department. On July 5, 1965, he was shot and killed in the line of duty, when he and another officer answered a disturbance call. Coley's badge number was 405.

References

External links

Profile, findagrave.com; accessed November 1, 2014

1915 births
1965 deaths
People from North Braddock, Pennsylvania
Players of American football from Pennsylvania
American football quarterbacks
Pittsburgh Steelers players
Chicago Cardinals players
NC State Wolfpack football players
United States Army personnel of World War II
American police officers killed in the line of duty
Deaths by firearm in Pennsylvania
Card-Pitt players